Nairn County Football Club is a Scottish senior football club based in the town of Nairn, Highland. Nicknamed the Wee County, they were founded in 1914 and play at Station Park. They have played in the Highland Football League since 1919, winning their only league title in the 1975–76 season. As a full member of the Scottish Football Association, they qualify automatically to play in the Scottish Cup.

In 2022, the club hit the headlines for selling a Pie in a Roll and launching their TeamHamish charity third kit.

In the same year they became the first football club in Scotland to offer and promote a dedicated stag and hen party package.

History
Nairn County were reformed in 1914 and joined the Highland League in 1919. Their only league title was in the 1975–76 season, which they won after a play-off in extra time against Fraserburgh at Borough Briggs, Elgin. Recent success was achieved in the 2005–06 season, with an unexpected North of Scotland Cup win. Nairn County also won the North of Scotland Cup in 2012 by defeating Wick Academy 2–1. During Nairn's Scottish Cup run in 2012, Nairn defeated Preston Athletic and Clyde, whilst in the third round were trailing 3–0 at half time against Forfar Athletic and staged a remarkable comeback with the game ending 3–3.

Striker Conor Gethins was awarded with the Highland League Player of the Year for the 2012–13 season.

The club’s record appearance holder is Glenn Main who as of the end of the 2021-22 season had made 481 appearances.

The club’s record goal scorer is Davy Johnston who scored 288 goals in his two spells with the club. This also included scoring a record 73 goals in the 1963-64 season.

Colours
The team’s home colours are yellow and black.

Away colours are red with white shorts and the third kit is a rainbow shirt with blue shorts and blue socks.

Stadium

Nairn County play at Station Park in Nairn, which has a capacity of 2,250, including 250 seats.

Gallery

Reserve Team
Nairn County's reserve team play in the North Caledonian Football League, in the sixth tier of the Scottish football league system. They mostly play their home games at Nairn Academy in the town.

Club honours
Highland Football League:
Champions: 1975–76
League Cup:
Winners: 1963–64, 2010–11
North of Scotland Cup:
Winners: 1956–57, 1962–63, 1963–64, 1965–66, 2005–06, 2008–09, 2012–13
Inverness Cup:
Winners: 1977–78
 Scottish Qualifying Cup (North):
Winners: 1968–69
Elgin District Cup: 
Winners: 1919–20, 1931–32, 1935–36
Elginshire Charity Cup:
Winners: 1924–25
Inverness Sports Bed Cup:
Winners: 1938–39

References

External links
 Official website
Nairn County Archive

 
Football clubs in Scotland
Highland Football League teams
Association football clubs established in 1914
1914 establishments in Scotland
Football in Highland (council area)
Nairn